Harbison is a surname. Notable people with the surname include:

Beth Harbison, American author
Clarence Ellis Harbison (1885–1960), American animal psychologist
E. Harris Harbison (1907–1964), American academic
Ed Harbison (born 1941), American politician
Frederick H. Harbison (1912–1976), American organizational theorist
Joan Harbison (born 1938), British academic
John Harbison (born 1938), American composer
John Harbison (pathologist) (1935–2020), first State pathologist of Ireland
Mercy Harbison (1770–1837), American writer
Michael Harbison, Australian politician
Thomas Harbison (1864–1930), Irish politician
Thomas Grant Harbison (1862–1936), American botanist
Tre Harbison (born 1998), American football player

Harbison may also refer to:

Harbison cheese by Jasper Hill Farm

See also
Harbison Canyon, California
Harbison Township, Dubois County, Indiana

English-language surnames
Surnames of British Isles origin